Events in the year 2018 in Pakistan.

Incumbents
 President 
 Mamnoon Hussain - September 2013 - September 2018
 Arif Alvi - September 2018 - incumbent
 Prime Minister 
 Shahid Khaqan Abbasi - August 2017 to May 2018
 Nasirul Mulk - May 2018 to August 2018
 Imran Khan - August 2018 to incumbent

Governors
 Governor of Balochistan – Muhammad Khan Achakzai (until 4 October); Amanullah Khan Yasinzai (from 4 October)
 Governor of Gilgit-Baltistan – Mir Ghazanfar Ali Khan (until 14 September); Raja Jalal Hussain Maqpoon (starting 14 September)
 Governor of Khyber Pakhtunkhwa – 
 until 20 August: Iqbal Zafar Jhagra 
 20 August-5 September: Mushtaq Ahmed Ghani
 from 5 September: Shah Farman
 Governor of Punjab – 
 until 18 August: Malik Muhammad Rafique Rajwana 
 18 August-5 September: Chaudhry Pervaiz Elahi
 from 5 September: Chaudhry Mohammad Sarwar
 Governor of Sindh – Mohammad Zubair (until 29 July); Imran Ismail (from 27 August)

Events

January
 3 January - Pakistani cricket team in New Zealand in 2017–18
 13 January - The killing of Naqeebullah Mehsud in a fake encounter staged by the senior superintendent of police (SSP) Rao Anwar in Karachi sparked countrywide protests against extrajudicial killings. The Pashtun Tahafuz Movement (PTM), led by Manzoor Pashteen, launched a campaign to seek justice for Naqeebullah Mehsud.

February
9 - 25 February - Pakistan at the 2018 Winter Olympics
 22 February - 2018 Pakistan Super League

March
 3 March - The 2018 elections to the Senate of Pakistan were held.

April
 4 April - Pakistan at the 2018 Commonwealth Games
 25 April - 2018 Pakistan Cup

May
 24–27 may - The twenty-fifth amendment to the Constitution of Pakistan was approved by the Parliament of Pakistan and the Provincial Assembly of Khyber Pakhtunkhwa (KP), giving way to the merger of the Federally Administered Tribal Areas (FATA) into the Province of Khyber Pakhtunkhwa (KP).

June
 3 June - Pakistan at 2018 Women's Twenty20 Asia Cup

July
 6 July - Former Prime Minister Nawaz Sharif, his daughter Maryam Nawaz and son-in-law Safdar Awan were given prison sentences of 10, 7 and 1 years respectfully on controversial corruption charges.  
 10 July - A suicide bombing at a political rally of the Awami National Party in Peshawar left 22 people dead.
 13 July - Two suicide bombings, one in Bannu and one in Mastung, left 5 and 131 people dead respectively. The former targeted the vehicle of former KPK Chief Minister Akram Durrani, while the latter targeted a political rally of the Balochistan Awami Party. 
 25 July 
The 2018 Pakistani general elections were held.
2018 Pakistani provincial elections.
 A suicide bombing at a polling station in Quetta left 31 people dead.

August
17 August  - PTI leader Imran Khan took oath as Prime Minister of Islamic republic of Pakistan.
18 August - Pakistan at the 2018 Asian Games

September
 4 September - The 2018 Pakistani presidential election were held.

October

 11 October - Eight children die and three are injured when the wall of a house collapses in the suburban area of Sukkur, Pakistan.
 14 October - October 2018 Pakistani by-elections
 31 October - Supreme Court of Pakistan acquitted Asia Bibi blasphemy case based on insufficient evidence.

November
 23 November
 Pakistani police repelled an armed attack on the Chinese consulate in Karachi, suffering two casualties
 A suicide bombing in Orazkai District, Khyber Pakhtunkhwa killed 33

December
former Minister Nawaz Sherief is sentenced to seven years

Arts

Cinema

Economy
 2017–18 Pakistan federal budget
 2018–19 Pakistan federal budget

Politics
 2018 Pakistani general election
 2018 Pakistani Senate election

Sport

Cricket
Domestic
 2017–18 Departmental One Day Cup
 2018 Pakistan Super League

International
 2018 Blind Cricket World Cup
 Pakistani cricket team in New Zealand in 2017–18
 West Indian cricket team in Pakistan in 2017–18
 Pakistani cricket team in England in 2018
 Pakistani cricket team in Ireland in 2018
 Pakistani cricket team in Scotland in 2018
 2018 Zimbabwe Tri-Nation Series
 Pakistani cricket team in Zimbabwe in 2018
 Pakistani cricket team in South Africa in 2018–19

Asian Tournaments
 2018 Asia Cup

Tournaments
 Pakistan at the 2018 Winter Olympics
 Pakistan at the 2018 Commonwealth Games

Deaths
 January 4 – Zubaida Tariq, 72, chef, Parkinson's disease.
 January 5 – Asghar Khan, 96, politician and military officer, Commander-in-Chief of the Air Force (1957–1965).
 January 5 – Rasa Chughtai, 89, Urdu poet.
 January 5 – Sardar Ahmed Ali Khan Pitafi, 74, politician, cancer. He served between 2014 and 2017.
February 1 - Haji Saifullah Khan Bangash, 70, politician.
February 1-Hazar Khan Bijarani, 71, politician.
February 1-Fariha Razzaq Haroon, journalist and politician. 
February 5 - Siddiq Baloch, 77, journalist and political economist. 
February 8 - Khalid Mehsud, 44, terrorist.
 February 11 - Asma Jahangir, 66, human rights lawyer and social activist.
 February 11 - Qazi Wajid, 87, actor.
 March 5 – Jam Saqi, 73, Pakistani politician.
 March 11 – Muhammad Ashiq, 82, racing cyclist.
 March 20 – Ayaz Soomro, 59, politician.
 April 25 – Madeeha Gauhar, 62, actress, cancer.
 June 20 - Mushtaq Ahmed Yousfi, 94, humorist, banker and journalist
 June 21 – Jamsheed Marker, 96, diplomat
 July 21 - Annie Ali Khan, 38, model, writer and journalist
July 13 - Siraj Raisani, 55 Shaheed Suicide bombing Killed Politician
July 10 - Haroon Bilour, 50 Shaheed Suicide Bomb Politician
 September 11 - Kalsoom Nawaz, 68, former First Lady of Pakistan
 October 8 -Shaikh Aziz, 79, journalist and scholar.
 December 25-  Syed Ali Raza Abidi former MNA and former member of MQM Pakistan, killed in a targeted attack in front of his house, Karachi

Public holidays

See also

 Timeline of Pakistani history

References

 
Pakistan
Years of the 21st century in Pakistan
2010s in Pakistan
Pakistan